Danville High School may refer to:
Danville High School (Alabama)
Danville High School (Arkansas)
Danville High School (Illinois)
Danville Community High School, a high school in Indiana
Danville High School (Iowa)
Danville High School (Kentucky)
Danville High School (Ohio)
Danville High School (Pennsylvania)
Danville High School (Vermont)